Nia Jones (born 6 April 1992) is an athlete who represents Wales internationally at both netball and football. She won the FAW Young Player of the Year Award in 2011. She was nominated for the SportingWales Magazine and UWIC Rising Star Award in 2013.

Early and personal life
Jones was born in Wrexham. After attending school at Ysgol Maes Garmon she later studied Sports and PE at the University of Wales Institute, Cardiff.

Netball career

Jones plays netball as either goal defence or wing defence. She began her career at Mold Netball Club, and she captained the Welsh national teams at under-17 and under-21 youth level. She is currently Co-Captain of the Wales Senior Team. 

Jones plays for the Severn Stars and the Welsh national team, and she was a squad member at the 2013 Netball Europe Open Championship where they won Gold. She was also part of Team Wales at the 2014 and 2018 Commonwealth Games. She has been selected in the Welsh squad to play in the two-match series against New Zealand in 2017.

Football career

Jones began her career at Northop Hall Girls, and played for Wales at under-17, under-19 and under-21 level before scoring on her senior debut aged 18, as a substitute in an 8-1 victory over Bulgaria in 2010. 

She played club football for Cardiff City, before moving to Reading in the FAWSL in July 2015. She has also played numerous times at senior international level for Wales.

References

1992 births
Living people
Welsh netball players
Welsh women's footballers
Wales women's international footballers
Cardiff City Ladies F.C. players
Reading F.C. Women players
Yeovil Town L.F.C. players
Women's Super League players
Women's association football defenders
Netball players at the 2018 Commonwealth Games
Severn Stars players
Celtic Dragons players
Commonwealth Games competitors for Wales